Koron may refer to:

 Koron (Cappadocia), now in Turkey
 Koron (music), in Persian traditional music

See also
 Karun, Hormozgan or Korūn, Iran
 Koroni or Corone, Greece
 Coron (disambiguation)
 Colon (disambiguation)
 Colón (disambiguation)
 Kolon (disambiguation)